The Penang Islamic Museum is a museum about Islam in George Town, Penang, Malaysia.

History
The museum is housed in a restored villa originally built in 1860 that was once the residence of a powerful Acehnese pepper merchant. Later it was used as a recycling depot for Penang's Indian Chettiar community. Restoration work was carried out in 1996 and it was awarded the Best Project award in 1999.

Architecture
The museum building features mid 19th century Straits style.

Exhibitions
The museum exhibits the role and contributions of Malay leaders in the growth and spread of Islam in Penang and Malaysia. It also houses the details on key 19th and early 20th century public figures and their influence in Penang. Another collection is the 19th century furniture and a life-sized diorama of a dock scene, which depicts a maritime-oriented hajj.

See also
 List of museums in Malaysia
 Islam in Malaysia

References

Buildings and structures in George Town, Penang
Islamic museums in Malaysia
Museums in Penang
Tourist attractions in George Town, Penang